Sandrine Lévêque-Fort is a French optical physicist working in the field of Super-resolution imaging at Paris-Saclay University.
She was the recipient of the French Minister of Higher Education, Research and Innovation Irène Joliot-Curie Prize in 2020.

Education and career 
Lévêque-Fort holds a master's degree from Paris-Sorbonne University and conducted her doctoral research at ESPCI Paris, which she completed in 2000. She then joined the Imperial College in London as a postdoctoral fellow, before joining the French National Centre for Scientific Research.

Awards and honours 
 2020 Irène Joliot-Curie Prize

References

External links
Lévêque-Fort group

French physicists
Living people
Paris-Sorbonne University alumni
Paris-Saclay University people
French women physicists
Year of birth missing (living people)